The men's team modern pentathlon competition at the 2014 Asian Games in Incheon was held on 3 October 2014.

Schedule
All times are Korea Standard Time (UTC+09:00)

Results

References

Results

External links
Official website

Modern pentathlon at the 2014 Asian Games